X-Press Feeders/Sea Consortium is a container shipping group operating out of Singapore. It is the 17th largest operator by capacity according to the Top 100 ranking for 2021 published by the maritime portal Alphaliner. It feeds transshipment hubs and ports in East and Southeast Asia, Indian subcontinent, the Persian Gulf, Mediterranean and Europe.

History
Sea Consortium/X-Press Feeders was founded in January 1972. The Singapore-based group is privately held. X-Press Feeders is run as a shipper owned container (SOC) carrier and does not own boxes. It operates a fleet of 110 vessels of which are 43 owned.

Alphaliner, a maritime transport portal in its 2021 Top 100 ranking, has placed X-Press Feeders as the 17th largest container carrier in the world, with a weekly capacity of 134,000 twenty-foot equivalent units (TEU).

In April 2021, the group was reported to have ordered four 7,000 TEU ships from Shanghai Waigaoqiao Shipbuilding of China in an upsizing of the fleet. Its largest ship up to then was around 4,400 TEUs.

Separately the group had placed orders for four 3,700 TEU box ships with China's Zhoushan Changhong International Shipyard in 2018. Two of the vessels, MV X-Press Mekong and MV  were delivered in 2021.

Acquisitions
X-Press Feeders acquired TransAtlantic AB, a subsidiary of Swedish supply vessel operator Viking Supply Ships in 2015. The transaction involved TransFeeder North Line, TransBothnia Container Line and TransFeeder South Line, with an annual container volume of about 105,000 TEUs.

Incidents 
On May 20, 2021, MV X-Press Pearl, a 37,000 DWT container ship with a capacity of 2,700 TEUs, caught fire while anchored off Colombo Harbour in Sri Lanka, and later sank. Debris and flotsam led to environmental damage triggering a criminal probe amid fears of an oil spill.

See also

 List of oil spills
 List of container shipping companies by ship fleets and containers

References

External links

 website

Container shipping companies
Freight transport companies
Transport operators of Singapore
Shipping companies of Singapore